Fourteen was an unincorporated community in Lincoln County, West Virginia, United States. Its post office was organized on January 10, 1877.

The origin of the name "Fourteen" is obscure.

References

Unincorporated communities in Lincoln County, West Virginia
Unincorporated communities in West Virginia